Maori onion is a common name for one of three separate plant species in the genus Bulbinella native to New Zealand:

Flora of New Zealand